Louise Penny   is a Canadian author of mystery novels set in the Canadian province of Quebec centred on the work of francophone Chief Inspector Armand Gamache of the Sûreté du Québec. Penny's first career was as a radio broadcaster for the Canadian Broadcasting Corporation (CBC). After she turned to writing, she won numerous awards for her work, including the Agatha Award for best mystery novel of the year five times, including four consecutive years (2007–2010), and the Anthony Award for best novel of the year five times, including four consecutive years (2010–2013). Her novels have been published in 23 languages.

Early life and career with CBC
Penny was born in Toronto, Canada, in 1958. Her mother was an avid reader of both fiction and non-fiction, with a particular liking for crime fiction,
and Louise grew up reading mystery writers such as Agatha Christie, Georges Simenon, Dorothy L. Sayers, and Michael Innes.

Penny earned a Bachelor of Applied Arts (Radio and Television) from Ryerson Polytechnical Institute (now Toronto Metropolitan University) in 1979. After graduation, aged 21, she embarked on an 18-year career as a radio host and journalist with the Canadian Broadcasting Corporation (CBC).

Literary career
Penny left the CBC in 1996 to take up writing. She started a historical novel but had difficulty finishing it, and eventually switched to mystery writing. She entered her first novel, Still Life, in the "Debut Dagger" competition in the United Kingdom, placing second out of 800 entries. The novel won other awards, including the "New Blood" Dagger award in the United Kingdom, the Arthur Ellis Award in Canada for best first crime novel, the Dilys Award, the Anthony Award and the Barry Award for Best First Novel in the United States.

Penny continues to write, garnering major crime novel award nominations for almost every one of her novels and subsequently winning several of those awards.

Her work features Chief Inspector Armand Gamache, head of the homicide department of the Sûreté du Québec. The novels are set in the province of Quebec but feature many hallmarks of the British whodunit genre, including murders by unconventional means, bucolic villages, large casts of suspects, red herrings, and a dramatic disclosure of the murderer in the last few pages of the book.

In 2009, Penny helped to launch a new award for aspiring Canadian mystery writers, the Unhanged Arthur for Best Unpublished First Novel.

Personal life
At the start of her broadcasting career, Penny took postings at locations far from friends and family, and to help deal with feelings of loneliness and isolation, she increasingly turned to alcohol. At the age of 35, she admitted to an alcohol problem, and has been sober since. Shortly afterwards, she met her future husband, Michael Whitehead, head of hematology at Montreal Children's Hospital, on a blind date. Michael died on September 18, 2016.

Penny currently lives in Knowlton, a small village in Quebec's Eastern Townships about 100 km from Montreal, Quebec.

Honours
In 2013, she was made a Member of the Order of Canada "for her contributions to Canadian culture as an author shining a spotlight on the Eastern Townships of Quebec". In 2017 she was made a Member of the Order of Quebec.

Movie adaptations
For several years, Penny resisted selling the TV or movie rights to her books, afraid of losing creative control of her characters. However, when approached by PDM Entertainment and Attraction Images and offered a position as executive producer during film production, she changed her mind and agreed to sell them the rights to her first two novels. Still Life went into production in the fall of 2012, with British actor Nathaniel Parker cast as Chief Inspector Gamache. The movie aired on CBC TV in 2013. In September 2021, production of Three Pines began in Montreal and rural Quebec, starring Alfred Molina.

Works

Inspector Gamache series 

 Still Life (2005) – Winner of the New Blood Dagger award, the Arthur Ellis Award, the Dilys Award, the 2007 Anthony Award, and the Barry Award
 A Fatal Grace (Alternate title: Dead Cold and White Out as the television episode) (2007) – Winner of the 2007 Agatha Award
 The Cruelest Month (2008) – Winner of the 2008 Agatha Award; nominated for the 2009 Anthony, the 2008 Macavity Award, and the 2008 Barry Award
 The Murder Stone (A Rule Against Murder in U.S.) (2009) – Nominated for an Arthur Ellis Award
 The Brutal Telling (2009) – Winner of the 2009 Agatha Award, and the 2010 Anthony Award
 Bury Your Dead (2010) – Winner of the 2010 Agatha Award, the 2011 Anthony Award, the 2011 Macavity Award, the 2011 Arthur Ellis Award, and the 2011 Nero Award
 A Trick of the Light (2011) – Nominated for a Macavity, an Anthony Award, and an Agatha Award
 The Hangman (2011) – A novella in the Inspector Gamache series, written at a third grade level for emerging adult readers.
 The Beautiful Mystery (2012) – Winner of the 2013 Macavity Award for Best Mystery
 How the Light Gets In (2013) – Nominated for an Edgar Award and an Agatha Award
 The Long Way Home (2014) – Inspector Gamache's friend Clara enlists him to find her missing husband, Peter.
 The Nature of the Beast (2015) – Quebec ballistics scientist and international artillery expert Gerald Bull's assassination and his supergun are central plot elements.
 A Great Reckoning (2016) – A map found in the walls of the local Three Pines bistro leads Gamache to shattering secrets on his new job as the superintendent of the Surete Academy.
 Glass Houses (2017) – A dark figure appears in Three Pines and leads Gamache to an old wives tale and murder.
 Kingdom of the Blind (2018) – Gamache, Myrna and a young builder are named executors of a will for a woman none of them has ever met.
A Better Man (2019)
 All the Devils Are Here (2020) -- set in Paris.
 The Madness of Crowds (2021)
 A World of Curiosities (2022)

Other works 
 State of Terror (2021), co-written with Hillary Clinton

References

Further reading 
 Ledford-Miller, Linda. "The Dangers of Village Life: The Novels of Louise Penny". The Nashwaak Review  38–39 (January 2018): 297–313.

External links

Official Website
St. Martin's Author Profile
 Feature in SHOTS Crime & Thriller Ezine "Louise Penny Tells All"
 

1958 births
Agatha Award winners
Living people
Canadian women novelists
Canadian mystery writers
Canadian crime fiction writers
Writers from Toronto
Nero Award winners
Anthony Award winners
Macavity Award winners
Barry Award winners
Toronto Metropolitan University alumni
Dilys Award winners
Women mystery writers
Members of the Order of Canada